This is a list of presidents of Benin (formerly Dahomey) since the formation of the post of President in 1960, to the present day.

List of officeholders
Key
Political parties

Other factions

Status

Timeline

Notes

See also
President of Benin
Vice President of Benin
List of prime ministers of Benin
List of colonial governors of Dahomey
Politics of Benin

References

External links
World Statesmen (Benin)

Benin

Presidents
1960 establishments in the Republic of Dahomey
Presidents